Adele Mara (born Adelaida Delgado; April 28, 1923 – May 7, 2010) was an American actress, singer, and dancer, who appeared in films during the 1940s and 1950s and on television in the 1950s and 1960s.

Early years
Mara was born in Highland Park, Michigan, to Spanish parents. She had a brother, Luis, who became an actor.

Dancing
Mara danced as part of bandleader Xavier Cugat's show as well as on two episodes of Maverick entitled "Seed of Deception" and "The Spanish Dancer".

Film 
Under the professional name of Adele St. Mara, she won a contract with Columbia Pictures and gained experience in the studio's "B" features and comedy shorts. This was soon shortened to Adele Mara. One of Mara's early roles was as a receptionist in the Three Stooges film I Can Hardly Wait. Mara and Leslie Brooks played the sisters of Rita Hayworth's character in the Fred Astaire film You Were Never Lovelier. In Alias Boston Blackie (1942), she plays the leading female role, as the sister of an escaped and wrongfully accused convict.

When her Columbia contract lapsed, she moved to Republic Pictures, where she became a fixture in the studio's westerns and outdoor adventures. She appeared in The Vampire's Ghost, Wake of the Red Witch starring John Wayne, Angel in Exile (leading lady), Sands of Iwo Jima with John Wayne in which she was John Agar's love interest, California Passage (leading lady), and Don Siegel's Count the Hours (supporting role).

Television 
In 1955 Mara appeared as Sarita on the TV western Cheyenne in the episode "Border Showdown."
In 1958, Mara played Maria Costa in the Bat Masterson episode "Double Showdown" with Gene Barry. In 1961, Mara appeared as a nurse with Cesar Romero on CBS's The Red Skelton Show in a sketch titled "Deadeye and The Alamo". About this time, she guest-starred on the NBC Western series The Tall Man with Clu Gulager, as well as three episodes of Maverick (one with James Garner and Jack Kelly and two with only Kelly), and episodes of Laramie, Tales of Wells Fargo with Dale Robertson and The Life and Legend of Wyatt Earp with Hugh O'Brien. She also appeared in the Alfred Hitchcock Hour episode "House Guest" in 1962.

Personal
Mara was married to screenwriter/series creator/producer/novelist Roy Huggins and appeared as the leading lady in three episodes of his 1957 television series Maverick. They had three sons, Thomas in 1960, John in 1961, and James Patrick in 1963 and remained married until his death at age 87 in 2002. The marriage had spanned half a century. 

Mara's brother, Luis Delgado played small, often uncredited roles in films and TV, especially in the projects of his close friend James Garner, for whom Delgado also worked as a personal assistant.

Death
Mara died of natural causes at age 87 on May 7, 2010.

Selected filmography

 Honolulu Lu (1941) as Debutante (uncredited)
 Navy Blues (1941)
 You Were Never Lovelier (1942) as Lita Acuna
 Alias Boston Blackie (1942) as Eve Sanders
 Blondie Goes to College (1942) as Babs Connelly
 Shut My Big Mouth (1942)
 Crime Doctor (1943) as Nurse (uncredited)
 Redhead from Manhattan (1943) as Check Girl (uncredited)
 Riders of the Northwest Mounted (1943) as Gabrielle Renaud (uncredited)
 Reveille with Beverly (1943) as Evelyn Ross
 Call of the South Seas (1944) as Aritana
 Atlantic City (1944) as Adele – Barmaid
 The Fighting Seabees (1944) as Twinkler Tucker – Jitterbugger (uncredited)
 Faces in the Fog (1944) as Gertrude
 Thoroughbreds (1944) as Sally Crandall
 Girls of the Big House (1945) as Harriett
 Song of Mexico (1945) as Carol Adams
 The Tiger Woman (1945) as Sharon Winslow
 Bells of Rosarita (1945) as Patty Phillips
 Flame of Barbary Coast (1945) as Marie (uncredited)
 The Vampire's Ghost (1945) as Lisa
 Earl Carroll Vanities (1945) as Chorine (uncredited)
 Grissly's Millions (1945) as Maribelle
 The Inner Circle (1946) as Geraldine Travis alias Gerry Smith
 I've Always Loved You (1946) as Senorita Fortalega
 The Magnificent Rogue (1946) as Sugar Lee
 The Invisible Informer (1946) as Marie Ravelle
 The Last Crooked Mile (1946) as Bonnie
 Night Train to Memphis (1946) as Constance Stephenson
 Traffic in Crime (1946) as Silk Cantrell
 Passkey to Danger (1946) as Renee Beauchamps
 The Catman of Paris (1946) as Marguerite Duval
 A Guy Could Change (1946) as Bernice
 Exposed (1947) as Belinda Prentice
 Blackmail (1947) as Sylvia Duane
 Robin Hood of Texas (1947) as Julie
 The Trespasser (1947) as Deedee
 Web of Danger (1947) as Peg Mallory
 Twilight on the Rio Grande (1947) as Elena Del Rio
 Wake of the Red Witch (1948) as Teleia Van Schreeven
 Night Time in Nevada (1948) as Joan Andrews
 Angel in Exile (1948) as Raquel Chavez
 I, Jane Doe (1948) as Marga–Jane Hastings
 The Gallant Legion (1948) as Catalina
 Campus Honeymoon (1948) as Bessie Ormsbee
 The Main Street Kid (1948) as Gloria
 Sands of Iwo Jima (1949) as Allison Bromley
 Rock Island Trail (1950) as Constance Strong
 California Passage (1950) as Beth Martin
 The Avengers (1950) as Maria Moreno
 The Sea Hornet (1951) as Suntan Radford aka Golbraid
 Count the Hours (1953) as Gracie Sager – Max Verne's girlfriend
 The Black Whip (1956) as Ruthie Dawson
 Back from Eternity (1956) as Maria Alvarez, an airplane stewardess
 Curse of the Faceless Man (1958) as Maria Fiorillo
 The Big Circus (1959) as Maria 'Mama' Colino

References

External links

 
 
 
 

1923 births
2010 deaths
American film actresses
20th-century American actresses
American people of Spanish descent
Fordson High School alumni
Actresses from Michigan
People from Highland Park, Michigan
21st-century American women